Lyudmyla Kichenok and Nadiya Kichenok were the defending champions, but withdrew in the first round.

Sofia Arvidsson and Jill Craybas won the title by defeating Caroline Garcia and Aurélie Védy in the final 6–4, 4–6, [10–7].

Seeds

Draw

Draw

External Links
 Main Draw

Open GDF Suez Region Limousin - Doubles
Open de Limoges